The Paris Dakar Bike Race is a cycle race of 7,000 kilometers through France, Andorra, Spain, Morocco, Western Sahara, Mauritania and Senegal organized by Bike Dreams, a Netherlands-based company. The race lasts 10 weeks and is divided in 59 stages and 11 rest days. The races crosses the Sahara desert by the Atlantic Route.
It is not related to the Dakar Rally in which entrants use only motorized transport.

Results 

In 2010 the event was cancelled indefinitely by the organisers following negative travel advice for Mauritania. By early 2019, the situation in Mauritania had improved and Bike Dreams announced the ride would restart in 2020. There was tremendous interest internationally and the ride was filled within less than a week, a year and a half in advance. The 2020 edition was to start in Paris on September 6 and end in Dakar on November 17. Due to Covid-19, the 2020 edition was postponed to 2021.

External links
 Bike Dreams website

Road bicycle races